Mathilde Rupp (27 March 187911 April 1932), known by the stage name Tilly Bébé, was an Austrian circus performer. She was noted for her performances with large predators and is considered a pioneer in the performance aspects of lion taming. In addition to live acts, she participated in making silent films. Rupp was born in Vienna and initially trained to be a typist. She began performing with hyenas around 1897 and her father accepted her career choice, becoming her manager two years later. Bébé made appearances in many European capitals throughout her career with both lions and polar bears. She also toured South America in the 1920s. Performing into her 50s, she died in Vienna in 1932.

Early life
Mathilde Rupp was born on 27 March 1879 in Perchtoldsdorf, Austria-Hungary. Her father, Franz Xaver Rupp, was a greengrocer and her grandfather was the teacher and composer . She grew up in the school building on the town square and her mother died when she was nine years old.

Rupp initially trained to be a typist at the Commercial Institute of Vienna. She obtained a job in a law firm but left to pursue a career caring for animals. Initially her father opposed the career choice, but in 1899 he gave in to her wishes, not only providing his approval but becoming her manager.

Career

Rupp was first hired by the Vienna Vivarium as a snake handler in the herpetarium. Wanting to expand her skills, she trained under R. Falk to work with hyenas and began circus work around 1897. Circus performing offered many opportunities that were unavailable to other women at the time and Rupp took advantage of them. She was able to choose her work, become financially independent and travel internationally.

Owing to her affection for her lions, she spent a lot of time with them; it was reported that she even slept with them. Her alternative lifestyle created considerable attention and led to the perception that she was in love with her animals, replacing life at home with a husband by her animals. By some accounts, she turned down suitors because of her love for her lions who vied for her caresses. Due to the erotic overtones in her act, she attracted press wherever she traveled and experienced the kind of fame that Mae West would have a decade later.

In 1901, she trained in Bonn, Germany at the Tierpark (animal park) with Contessa X, the stage name of the daughter of Joseph-Bertrand Abadie, who not only taught her how to work with lions but, intending to retire, sold Rupp part of her pride. It was the Contessa who gave Rupp the stage name Tilly Bébé (literally, "baby Tilly").

Due to her diminutive stature, Bébé performed dressed in the garb of a little girl, using her doll-like appearance to contrast with the ferocity of her pride of lions. A master at garnering publicity, she used the press to enhance her stage persona, with stories of her demure nature and her kindness to animals.

It was frequently reported that she was a teenager, that she had been a society figure and had suffered injuries. On Christmas Day 1901, while performing at a circus in Essen, Bébé freed a fellow lion tamer from an attack by a lion, but the tamer died. Despite this incident, Bébé was soon engaged in a show at the Cirque Medrano in Paris,
 and, by the end of the year, was a regular feature at the Rembrandt-Theatre in Amsterdam. Performing at the Belgian Circus Krembser, at the climax of her act she put her head inside a lion's mouth before carrying him out of the arena on her shoulders.

In 1908, she began making silent films. The first, Tilly Bébé, die berühmte Löwenbändigerin (Tilly Bébé, the Famous Lion Tamer), featured Bébé as a young girl cuddling with her giant cats before prying open the mouth of a lion to show his teeth. The film is one of the best examples of the "exotic-erotic-escapist" genre that became popular at the time. She hit it on the snout and moved away, dripping with blood. It turned out it was just an act as when it was repeated a few days later, she explained to the audience: "I just couldn't let him see I was frightened of him".

In 1913, she began performing in the colder months with a group of 20 polar bears. While performing with Carl Hagenbeck's circus in Germany, she handled a group of 40 polar bears. As with her lion performances, the press carried reports that the polar bears were docile in her care. She performed with them in the Circus Hagenbeek in The Hague in 1918. In 1923, Bébé went on tour with the Sarrasani Circus which performed throughout South America for two years. In Buenos Aires, when a lion escaped from its cage, she prevented it from being shot by grabbing it by the mane and returning it to the cage.

She performed into her 50s, having lost little of her drive. In 1928, she was working with Wilhelm Hagenbeck in Saxony. By 1930, it was reported that only three of the women who had previously worked in circuses with predators were still employed — Bébé, Mabel Stark, and a woman who performed as "Miss Texas".

Death and legacy
Bébé died in poverty, in Vienna on 11 April 1932. She is noted as a pioneer in lion taming and for her innovations in the docile training of predators. Roman Proske published Lions, Tigers, and Me in 1956, a memoir of his years as a lion tamer, including stories about Bébé and other circus people with whom he had performed.

Filmography
 1908: Tilly Bébé, die berühmte Löwenbändigerin, producer Deutsche Bioscop
 1916: Die Löwenbraut Tilly Bébé und ihre wilden Zöglinge, producer Duskes-Film Berlin
 1917: Der weiße Schrecken, producer Hagenbeck Films
 1917: When the Heart Burns with Hate, producer Saturn-Film AG
 1917: Der Sultan von Johore, producer Projektions-AG Union
 1917: Die Abenteuer des Kapitän Hansen, producer Eiko Film
 1919: Die graue Frau von Alençon, producer Discus-Film, Berlin

Notes

References

Citations

Bibliography

Further reading

1879 births
1932 deaths
Animal trainers
Austrian circus performers
Austrian silent film actresses
Lion tamers
People from Lower Austria
20th-century Austrian women